Yevgeny Aleksandrovich Yudchits (born 25 November 1996) is a Belarusian professional footballer who plays for Dinamo Brest.

References

External links 
 
 

1996 births
Living people
Belarusian footballers
Association football forwards
FC Energetik-BGU Minsk players
FC Dynamo Brest players